Chandler v Webster [1904] 1 KB 493 is an English contract law case, concerning frustration. It is one of the many coronation cases, which appeared in the courts after King Edward VII fell ill and his coronation was postponed.

Facts
Mr Webster agreed to let Mr Chandler a room on Pall Mall to watch the king's coronation on 26 June 1902 for £141 15s. It was understood between the parties that the money for the room should be paid before the procession. Mr Chandler hired the room with the intention of erecting a stand and selling tickets.

On 10 June Mr Chandler wrote to Mr Webster saying:

Mr Chandler paid £100 on 19 June but then the king fell ill. The question was whether the £100 could be recovered by Mr Chandler, or whether Mr Webster could demand the balance.

Judgment

High Court
Wright J held that the plaintiff was not entitled to recover the £100 which he had paid, and that, on the construction of the letter of 10 June, it appeared that the balance was not payable until after the procession, and consequently the defendant was not entitled to recover on the counter-claim.

Court of Appeal
Lord Collins MR, Romer LJ and Mathew LJ held that Mr Chandler was not entitled to recover his damages before the procession became impossible.

Reform
The Law Reform (Frustrated Contracts) Act 1943 provided, among other things, that monies provided in advance of performance of a contract are recoverable in the event of performance being frustrated.

See also

 Frustration in English law
Fibrosa Spolka Akcyjna v Fairbairn Lawson Combe Barbour Ltd [1943] AC 32
Krell v Henry
Herne Bay Steamboat Co v Hutton

Notes

English frustration case law
Court of Appeal (England and Wales) cases
1904 in case law
1904 in British law